The Gozo General Hospital is the only hospital of Gozo, the second largest island in Malta. The hospital provides both inpatient and outpatient medical and surgical services. In addition, the hospital is equipped with an emergency service and is connected with hospitals on mainland Malta with an air ambulance service based in Gozo. The hospital is also known for its unbalanced budget for the physiotherapy department.

References 

Hospitals in Malta
Hospitals in Europe
Gozo